Cabela's Alaskan Adventures (also known as Cabela's Big Game Hunter: 10th Anniversary Edition – Alaskan Adventure for Windows) is a 2006 hunting video game developed by Sand Grain Studios, Fun Labs and Magic Wand Productions and published by Activision for the Xbox 360 and PlayStation 2 video game consoles and Microsoft Windows. In April 2017, the Xbox 360 version was made backwards compatible with the Xbox One.

Gameplay 
The game features twelve different maps, including different regions in Alaska and the Arctic, where players may track or lure animals to complete goals. Numerous animals are available to hunt – bears such as the grizzly bear, black bear, glacier bear and polar bear appear from the tutorial onwards. Other hostile animals include coyotes, wolverines, Canada lynx, Arctic wolves, grey wolves, musk oxen, and bison. Roosevelt elk, Yukon moose and mountain goats are available to hunt, as well as Dall sheep, stone sheep, barren-ground caribou, and Sitka deer. Birds include Canada geese, harlequin ducks, spruce grouse, and ptarmigans. Small mammals include red foxes, Arctic foxes, and snowshoe hares. Players may also practice fishing, either with fishing rods or in the form of ice fishing with tip-ups. Money from successful hunts can be used to purchase better equipment including firearms and camping equipment. The game includes fines, which subtract money from the player if certain hunting laws are breached, such as firing a weapon too close to an occupied building.

Reception 

Cabela's Alaskan Adventures received mixed to negative reviews from critics. On Metacritic, the Xbox 360 version of the game holds a score of 48/100 based on 11 reviews.

Erik Brudvig of IGN rated the game a 4.8/10, criticizing the game for being a "sloppy port" and for its gameplay being "outside the realms of pure simulation and arcade fun". Dale Nardozzi of TeamXbox was more lenient on the game, rating it a 6.4/10, praising the gameplay and graphics as being "pretty decent" for a budget game.

References 

2006 video games
Activision games
Cabela's video games
PlayStation 2 games
Hunting video games
Video games set in Alaska
Sports video games set in the United States
Sports video games set in Canada
Video games developed in Romania
Windows games
Xbox 360 games
Fun Labs games
Single-player video games
Sand Grain Studios games
Magic Wand Productions games